Khalid Al-Nafisi (January 26, 1937 – March 27, 2006) was a Kuwaiti actor.

Works

Plays 
Saqr Quraish (1962)
Isht wa Shift (1964)
Ukhti Kelbah (2002)

Serials 
Darb alzalaq (1977)
Al-haialh (2003)

Movies 
Storm (1955)
Silence (1976)

References

1937 births
2006 deaths
Kuwaiti male actors
Kuwaiti male stage actors
Kuwaiti male film actors
20th-century Kuwaiti male actors
21st-century Kuwaiti male actors